Shelly "Sparky" Liddelow (born 30 June 1984 in Manjimup, Western Australia) plays field hockey for the Australian Women's Hockey Team, the Hockeyroos. She made her debut for Australia in 2007. Her Australian National Hockey League (NHL) team is WA Diamonds. Her local club is UWA Hockey Club.

Originally only a reserve player for the Hockeyroos, Shelly entered the spotlight after Fiona Johnson injured her hamstring. She scored two goals in her first Olympic match, helping Australia to win against South Korea.

Shelly has recently completed her Master of Pharmacy at Curtin University.

Playing credentials

International caps 
 15 – at start of Beijing Olympic Games

Career highlights 
 2010 – Delhi Commonwealth Games,(1st)
 2008 – Summer Olympics, Beijing China
 2007 – Hockeyroos debut, Champions Trophy, Quilmes Argentina (4th)
 2005 – Junior World Cup, Chile (4th)

Recent performances 
 2008 – Test Series (v England), Australi (1st)
 2007 – Good Luck Beijing Test Event, Beijing China (1st)
 2007 – World Cup, Quilmes Argentina (4th)

Major injuries 
 2006 – Stress fracture, hip
 2004 – Stress fracture, femur
 2003 – Compartments syndrome (surgery)

References
sports-reference

External links
 

1984 births
Living people
Australian female field hockey players
Field hockey players at the 2008 Summer Olympics
Olympic field hockey players of Australia
People from Manjimup, Western Australia
Field hockey people from Western Australia
Commonwealth Games medallists in field hockey
Commonwealth Games gold medallists for Australia
Field hockey players at the 2010 Commonwealth Games
Sportswomen from Western Australia
Medallists at the 2010 Commonwealth Games